Nakonanectes bradti is an elasmosaurid plesiosaur of the late Cretaceous found in 2010 the state of Montana in the United States. It is one of the most recently known elasmosaurids to have lived in North America. Unlike other elasmosaurids, it has a relatively short neck.

Description
In November 2010, hunter David Bradt stumbled on an elasmosaur fossil in a canyon on the Charles M. Russell National Wildlife Refuge. The specimen proved to be a new, short-necked species of elasmosaur, subsequently named Nakonanectes bradti.

The type specimen, MOR 3072, was nearly complete. This included the skull, a part not often found intact in Elasmosauridae fossils. Other elements of the fossil included the anterior cervical vertebrae, partial dorsal and caudal vertebrae, incomplete fore and hind limbs, gastralia, partial pectoral and pelvic girdles, and ribs.

The fossil was found in the Bearpaw Formation, a late Campanian/early Maastrichtian rock, making it one of the last known elasmosaurids to have lived in the Western Interior Seaway.

It also had a much shorter neck that most eleasmosaurids, with only 39 to 42 cervical vertebrae.

Classification
Danielle Serratos, Patrick Druckenmiller, and Roger Benson found that N. bradti is similar to the Aristonectinae, short-necked elasmosaurids known from fossils collected in South America. This indicates that short-necked elasmosaurids evolved in multiple locations on the globe.

References

Elasmosaurids
Fossil taxa described in 2017
Sauropterygian genera